Timeline of notable events in the research and development of sustainable energy, including renewable energy, solar energy, and nuclear fusion energy, particularly for ways that are sustainable within the Earth system.

Events currently not included in the timelines include:
 events of new goal-codifying policy about, commercialization of, adoptions of, deployment-statistics of, announced developments of, announced funding for and dissemination of sustainable energy -technologies and -infrastructure/systems
 research about related phase-outs in general – such as about the fossil fuel phase out
 research about relevant alternative technologies – such as in transport, HVAC, refrigeration, passive cooling, heat pumps and district heating
 research about related public awareness, media, policy-making and education
 research about related geopolitics, policies, and integrated strategies

Grids

Smart grids 

2022
 A study provides results of simulations and analysis of "transactive energy mechanisms to engage the large-scale deployment of flexible distributed energy resources (DERs), such as air conditioners, water heaters, batteries, and electric vehicles, in the operation of the electric power system".

Super grids 

2022
 Researchers describe a novel strategy to create a global sustainable interconnected energy system based on deep-ocean-compressed hydrogen transportation.

Microgrids and off-the-grid 

 Researchers describe a way for "inherently robust, scalable method of integration using multiple energy storage systems and distributed energy resources, which does not require any means of dedicated communication improvised controls", which could make microgrids easy and low cost "where they are needed most" such as during a power outage or after a disaster.

Solar power

Space-based solar power 

Ongoing research and development projects include SSPS-OMEGA, SPS-ALPHA, and the Solaris program.

2020
 The US Naval Research Laboratory conducts its first test of solar power generation in a satellite, the PRAM experiment aboard the Boeing X-37.

Floating solar 

2020
 A study concludes that deploying floating solar panels on existing hydro reservoirs could generate 16%–40% (4,251 to 10,616 TWh/year) of global energy needs when not considering project-siting constraints, local development regulations, "economic or market potential" and potential future technology improvements.

2022
 Researchers develop floating artificial leaves for light-driven hydrogen and syngas fuel production. The lightweight, flexible perovskite devices are scalable and can float on water similar to lotus leaves.

Agrivoltaics
 2021 – An improved agrivoltaic system with a grooved glass plate is demonstrated.
 2021 – A report reviews several studies about the potential of agrivoltaics, which partly suggest "high potential of agrivoltaics as a viable and efficient technology" and outline concerns for refinements to the technology.
 2022 – Researchers report the development of greenhouses (or solar modules) by a startup that generate electricity from a portion of the spectrum of sunlight, allowing spectra that interior plants use to pass through.

Solar-powered production

Water production 
Early 2020s
 Hydrogels are used to develop system that capture moisture (e.g. at night in a desert) to cool solar panels or to produce fresh water – including for irrigating crops as demonstrated in solar panel integrated systems where these have been enclosed next to or beneath the panels within the system.

Wind power 

2021
 A study using simulations finds that large scale vertical-axis wind turbines could outcompete conventional HAWTs (horizontal axis) wind farm turbines.
 Scientists report that due to decreases in power generation efficiency of wind farms downwind of offshore wind farms, cross-national limits and potentials for optimization need to be considered in strategic decision-making.
 Researchers report, based on simulations, how large wind-farm performance can be significantly improved using windbreaks.
 The world's first fully autonomous commercial "airborne wind energy" system (an airborne wind turbine) is launched by a company.
 An U.S. congressionally directed report concludes that "the resource potential of wind energy available to AWE systems is likely similar to that available to traditional wind energy systems" but that "AWE would need significant further development before it could deploy at meaningful scales at the national level".

Hydrogen energy 

2022
 Researchers increase water electrolysis performance of renewable hydrogen via capillary-fed electrolysis cells.
 A novel energy-efficient strategy for hydrogen release from liquid hydrogen carriers with the potential to reduce costs of storage and transportation is reported.
 Researchers report the development of a potential efficient, secure and convenient method to separate, purify, store and transport large amounts of hydrogen for energy storage in renewables-based energy systems as powder using ball milling.
 A way method for hydrogen production from the air, useful for off-the-grid settings, is demonstrated.
 A novel type of effective hydrogen storage using readily available salts is reported.
An electrolysis system for viable hydrogen production from seawater without requiring a pre-desalination process is reported, which could allow for more flexible and less costly hydrogen production.
Chemical engineers report a method to substantially increase conversion efficiency and reduce material costs of green hydrogen production by using sound waves during electrolysis.
2023
 In two paywalled studies separate teams of researchers report substantial improvements to green hydrogen production methods, enabling higher efficiencies and durable use of untreated seawater.

Hydroelectricity and marine energy 

2021
 Engineers report the development of a prototype wave energy converter that is twice as efficient as similar existing experimental technologies, which could be a major step towards practical viability of tapping into the sustainable energy source.

A study investigates how tidal energy could be best integrated into the Orkney energy system. A few days earlier, a review assesses the potential of tidal energy in the UK's energy systems, finding that it could, according to their considerations that include an economic cost-benefit analysis, deliver 34 TWh/y or 11% of its energy demand.

Energy storage

Electric batteries

2022
 In a paywalled article, scientists provide 3D imaging and model analysis to reveal main causes, mechanics, and potential mitigations of the prevalent lithium-ion battery degradation over charge cycles.
2023
 In two studies, researchers report that substitution of PET adhesive tapes could  self-discharge in the widely used lithium-ion batteries, extending battery life.

Thermal energy storage
 2022 – Researchers report the development of a system that combines the MOST solar thermal energy storage system that can store energy for 18 years with a chip-sized thermoelectric generator to generate electricity from it.

Novel and emerging types 

 2021 – A company generates its first power from a gravity battery at a site in Edinburgh. Other gravity batteries are also under construction by other companies.
 2022 – A study describes using lifts and empty apartments in tall buildings to store energy, estimating global potential around 30 to 300 GWh.

Nuclear fusion

Geothermal energy 

2022
 A study describes a way by which geothermal power plants  within their reservoirs for dispatch to (better) help manage intermittency of solar and wind.

Waste heat recovery

2020
 Reviews about WHR in the aluminium industry and cement industry are published.

Bioenergy, chemical engineering and biotechnology 

2020
 Scientists report the development of micro-droplets for algal cells or synergistic algal-bacterial multicellular spheroid microbial reactors capable of producing oxygen as well as hydrogen via photosynthesis in daylight under air.
2022
Researchers report the development of 3D-printed nano-"skyscraper" electrodes that house cyanobacteria for extracting substantially more sustainable bioenergy from their photosynthesis than before.

News outlets report about the development of algae biopanels by a company for sustainable energy generation with unclear viability after other researchers built the self-powered  house prototype in 2013.

General 
Research about sustainable energy in general or across different types.

Other energy-need reductions 

Research and development of (technical) means to substantially or systematically reduce need for energy beyond smart grids, education / educational technology (such as about differential environmental impacts of diets), transportation infrastructure (bicycles and rail transport) and conventional improvements of energy efficiency on the level of the energy system.
2020
 A study shows a set of different scenarios of minimal energy requirements for providing decent living standards globally, finding that – according to their models, assessments and data – by 2050 global energy use could be reduced to 1960 levels despite of 'sufficiency' still being materially relatively generous.
2022
 A trial of estimated financial energy cost of refrigerators alongside EU energy-efficiency class (EEEC) labels online finds that the approach of labels involves a trade-off between financial considerations and higher cost requirements in effort or time for the product-selection from the many available options which are often unlabelled and don't have any EEEC-requirement for being bought, used or sold within the EU.

Materials and recycling 

2020
 Researchers report that mining for renewable energy production will increase threats to biodiversity and publish a map of areas that contain needed materials as well as estimations of their overlaps with "Key Biodiversity Areas", "Remaining Wilderness" and "Protected Areas". The authors assess that careful strategic planning is needed.

2023
A study finds that the world has enough rare earths and other raw materials to switch from fossil fuels to renewable energy.

Seabed mining 
2020
 Researchers assess to what extent international law and existing policy support the practice of a proactive knowledge management system that enables systematic addressing of uncertainties about the environmental effects of seabed mining via regulations that, for example, enable the International Seabed Authority to actively engage in generating and synthesizing information.

2021
 A moratorium on deep-sea mining until rigorous and transparent impact assessments are carried out is enacted at the 2021 world congress of the International Union for the Conservation of Nature (IUCN). However, the effectiveness of the moratorium may be questionable as no enforcement mechanisms have been set up, planned or specified. Researchers have outlined why there is a need to avoid mining the deep sea.

2022
 Impossible Metals announces its first underwater robotic vehicle, 'Eureka 1', has completed its first trial of selectively harvesting polymetallic nodule rocks from the seabed nearly without harming the environment (as with other seabed mining) to help address the rising global need for metals for renewable energy system components – mainly batteries. Other likely far more harmful mining robots are in development as well by other companies.

Maintenance 

Maintenance of sustainable energy systems could be automated, standardized and simplified and the required resources and efforts for such get reduced via research relevant for their design and processes like waste management.
2022
 Researchers demonstrate electrostatic dust removal from solar panels.

Economics 
2021
 A review finds that the pace of cost-decline of renewables has been underestimated and that an "open cost-database would greatly benefit the energy scenario community". A 2022 study came to similar conclusions.
2022
 A study investigates funding allocations for public investment in energy research, development and demonstration.

Feasibility studies and energy system models 
2020
 A study suggests that all sector defossilisation can be achieved worldwide even for nations with severe conditions. The study suggests that integration impacts depend on "demand profiles, flexibility and storage cost".

2021
 Researchers develop an energy system model for 100% renewable energy, examining feasibility and grid stability in the U.S.

2022
 A revised or updated version of a major worldwide 100% renewable energy proposed plan and model is published.

Researchers review the scientific literature on 100% renewable energy, addressing various issues, outlining open research questions, and concluding there to be growing consensus, research and empirical evidence concerning its feasibility worldwide.

See also 

 Climate change adaptation
 Energy development
 Energy policy
 Funding of science
 Energy transition
 Green recovery
 Public research and development
 Policy studies
 Energy system
 Renewable energy#Emerging technologies
 List of emerging technologies#Energy
 Technology transfer
 Outline of energy
Not yet included
 Standardization#Environmental protection such as for certifications and policies
 Open energy system models
 Open energy system databases
 Power-to-X
 Nanogeneration such as synthetic molecular motors for microbots and nanobots
Timelines of related areas
 Timeline of materials technology#20th century
 Timeline of computing 2020–present
 Timeline of transportation technology#21st century

References 

Sustainable
Renewable energy
Sustainable development
History of energy
Technology timelines
Science timelines